Heavenstamp is a Japanese alternative rock band formed in 2009 by members Sally#Cinnamon, Tomoya.S, Shikichin, and Mika, all of whom were previously members of separate bands.

History 
Heavenstamp debuted with "Hype - E.P. + REMIXES" under record label Goldtone Records. The band is currently signed to Warner Music Japan. On October 5, 2011, they released their 3rd single titled "Waterfall - E.P. + REMIXES".

Discography
EP
 Hype - E.P. + REMIXES (December 8, 2010)
 Stand by you - E.P. + REMIXES (May 11, 2011)
 Waterfall - E.P. + REMIXES (October 5, 2011)
 Decadence-E.P.+REMIXES (March 28, 2012)

References: 

Japanese alternative rock groups
Musical groups from Tokyo